Erhard Weiß (May 26, 1914 – July 7, 1957) was a German diver who competed in the 1936 Summer Olympics. In 1936 he finished fourth in the 10 metre platform event and fifth in the 3 metre springboard competition; two years later at the 1938 European Aquatics Championships he won gold in both these events.

References

1914 births
1957 deaths
German male divers
Olympic divers of Germany
Divers at the 1936 Summer Olympics
20th-century German people